Servants of Sorcery is a Norwegian black metal album by Fimbulwinter, released by Hot Records in 1994. The album is actually a remaster of Fimbulwinter's 1992 demo, with an additional song.

Track listing

 "Intro" - 01:05	
 "When The Fire Leaps From The Ash Mountain" - 06:04	
 "Servants Of Sorcery" - 06:53	
 "Black Metal Storm" - 03:12	
 "Morbid Tales" (Celtic Frost cover) - 03:38	
 "Fimbulwinter Sacrifice" - 07:44	
 "Roaring Hellfire" - 07:36

Personnel
Shagrath - lead guitar
Necronos - rhythm guitar, vocals
Skoll - bass
Per Morten Bergseth - drums

1994 debut albums
Fimbulwinter albums